Dana Jae Schwartz (born January 7, 1993) is an American journalist, screenwriter and author. She was previously a correspondent at Entertainment Weekly; she is also the author of four books. She also writes and hosts Noble Blood, a historical weekly podcast for iHeartMedia about the dark side of monarchy.

Early life
Schwartz grew up in Highland Park, Illinois and was raised in a Jewish household. Schwartz attended Brown University on a public policy and a pre-medical course, but ultimately decided to become a writer. Schwartz was a Presidential Scholar.

Career 
After internships with Conan O'Brien and at The Late Show with Stephen Colbert, she began a career as a writer.

While an undergraduate, Schwartz attracted attention by setting up two parodic Twitter profiles, @GuyInYourMFA parodying pretentious and patronizing aspiring writers, and @DystopianYA parodying young adult fiction such as the Hunger Games series set in a dystopian future, both of which became popular with readers. Schwartz's success on Twitter helped launch her career in writing and publishing. She was named one of the hundred most influential people in Brooklyn culture by Brooklyn Magazine in 2016.

While a writer at The New York Observer, Schwartz wrote an open letter to her employer Jared Kushner criticizing his father-in-law Donald Trump's posting content from anti-Semitic sources on his Twitter feed, to which Kushner wrote a similar open letter in response.

Schwartz is the creator and host of the podcast Noble Blood, which focuses on stories from the lives of historical royals. The podcast debuted at No.1 on the iTunes podcast charts. The series was produced by Lore creator Aaron Mahnke.

Schwartz appeared on the September 29, 2020 episode of The George Lucas Talk Show with fellow guest Bill Corbett.

Screenwriting
Schwartz was a staff writer on the Marvel television series She-Hulk: Attorney at Law for Disney+. In 2021, she co-wrote Bring It On: Halloween with Rebekah McKendry, the seventh Bring It On movie which is intended to air in 2022.

Books

And We're Off 
Dana Schwartz has published four books. Her first book, a YA novel entitled And We're Off was published in May 2017. Seventeen Magazine named it one of the best books of the year, and Vulture listed it as one of the 10 best YA books of 2017.

Choose Your Own Disaster 
Schwartz's memoir, entitled Choose Your Own Disaster, was released in June 2018.

The White Man's Guide to White Male Writers of the Western Canon
A book narrated by the "GuyInYourMFA" Twitter account character, with illustrations by New Yorker cartoonist Jason Adam Katzenstein, was released November 2019.

Anatomy, A Love Story 
Schwartz's fourth book, Anatomy, A Love Story, was published on January 18, 2021. It was an instant #1 New York Times bestseller, and #1 Indie bestseller.

Personal life
Schwartz is currently based in Los Angeles. On September 4, 2022 she married American comedian Ian Karmel.

References

External links 

Entertainment Weekly author page

Living people
1993 births
21st-century American women writers
21st-century American non-fiction writers
21st-century American journalists
21st-century American Jews
21st-century American novelists
American women journalists
American women podcasters
American podcasters
American women non-fiction writers
American women novelists
American young adult novelists
Brown University alumni
Jewish American writers
Novelists from Illinois
People from Highland Park, Illinois
Women writers of young adult literature
American women television writers